Liberty Hill School, also known as the Liberty-Exway School and Covington Community Center, is a historic Rosenwald School for African-American students located near Ellerbe, in Richmond County, North Carolina. Built in 1930, it is a one-story, two-teacher school with American Craftsman design elements. The structure ceased to operate as a school in the mid-1950s and subsequently used as a community center.

It was listed on the National Register of Historic Places in 2008.

References

Rosenwald schools in North Carolina
School buildings on the National Register of Historic Places in North Carolina
School buildings completed in 1930
Buildings and structures in Randolph County, North Carolina
National Register of Historic Places in Richmond County, North Carolina
1930 establishments in North Carolina